Leonard Frederick Parslow (11 November 1909 – 6 August 1963) was an English cricketer.  Parslow was a right-handed batsman.  He was born at Islington, London.

Parslow made his only first-class appearance for Essex against Somerset in the 1946 County Championship.  He batted at number ten in the Essex first-innings, scoring 5 runs before he was dismissed by Johnny Lawrence.  In their second-innings he was promoted up the order to open the batting, scoring 4 runs before being dismissed by Bill Andrews.

He died at Rochford, Essex on 6 August 1963.

References

External links
Len Parslow at ESPNcricinfo
Len Parslow at CricketArchive

1909 births
1963 deaths
People from Islington (district)
Cricketers from Greater London
English cricketers
Essex cricketers